The 1985–86 Los Angeles Lakers season was the 40th season of the franchise, 38th in the National Basketball Association (NBA) and 26th in Los Angeles. The Lakers entered the season as the defending NBA champions, having defeated the previous NBA champion and rival Boston Celtics in the 1985 NBA Finals in six games, having finally defeated the Celtics in the NBA Finals after having lost to them 8 consecutive times in the championship series. The Lakers looked to repeat as NBA Champions, after sweeping the San Antonio Spurs in three games in the First Round, and then defeating the Dallas Mavericks in six games in the Semi-finals in the playoffs, but were unable to defend their title, as they lost to the Houston Rockets in the Conference Finals in five games after winning the first game, but proceeded to lose the following four. The Rockets would go on to lose to the Boston Celtics in the NBA Finals in six games.

NBA Draft
The 1985 NBA Draft took place on June 18, 1985. It was also the first NBA Draft of the "Lottery" era. The lottery was put into place so teams did not have to intentionally lose games to receive the number one pick.

Roster

Regular season
 On Wednesday, December 4, 1985, Maurice Lucas made a 60-foot shot at the regulation buzzer to send the game into overtime.  The Lakers would go on to defeat the Utah Jazz 131-127.
 The Lakers started the season 19-2.
 On Wednesday, January 22, 1986, the Boston Celtics (31-8) defeated the defending champion Lakers (32-8) 110-95 in a matchup of the league's two best teams.
 On Friday, January 24, 1986, the Boston Celtics (32-8) overtook the Los Angeles Lakers (32-9) as the team with the best record in the NBA.  The Celtics maintained the league's best record for the remainder of the season.
 On Thursday, February 6, 1986, Kareem Abdul-Jabbar scored 46 points in a game against the Houston Rockets, his highest single-game total since a 48-point performance against the Portland Trail Blazers on November 26, 1975.  The Lakers defeated the Rockets 117-95.
 On Sunday, February 16, 1986, in the season's second matchup between the Celtics and Lakers, this time in the Forum.  Boston won again, 105-99 despite not having All-Star Kevin McHale in the lineup.

Season standings

Record vs. opponents

Game log

Regular season

|- align="center" bgcolor="#ccffcc"
| 1
| October 26, 1985
| @ San Antonio
| W 121–116 (2OT)
|
|
|
| HemisFair Arena
| 1–0
|- align="center" bgcolor="#ccffcc"
| 2
| October 29, 1985
| @ Dallas
| W 133–115
|
|
|
| Reunion Arena
| 2–0
|- align="center" bgcolor="#ccffcc"
| 3
| October 31, 1985
| @ Phoenix
| W 144–107
|
|
|
| Arizona Veterans Memorial Coliseum
| 3–0

|- align="center" bgcolor="#ccffcc"
| 4
| November 2, 1985
| @ Golden State
| W 120–116
|
|
|
| Oakland-Alameda County Coliseum Arena
| 4–0
|- align="center" bgcolor="#ffcccc"
| 5
| November 5, 1985
| Cleveland
| L 111–129
|
|
|
| The Forum
| 4–1
|- align="center" bgcolor="#ccffcc"
| 6
| November 7, 1985
| @ Utah
| W 116–106
|
|
|
| Salt Palace Acord Arena
| 5–1
|- align="center" bgcolor="#ccffcc"
| 7
| November 8, 1985
| Denver
| W 128–99
|
|
|
| The Forum
| 6–1
|- align="center" bgcolor="#ccffcc"
| 8
| November 12, 1985
| Utah
| W 119–110
|
|
|
| The Forum
| 7–1
|- align="center" bgcolor="#ccffcc"
| 9
| November 14, 1985
| Portland
| W 114–102
|
|
|
| The Forum
| 8–1
|- align="center" bgcolor="#ccffcc"
| 10
| November 15, 1985
| @ L.A. Clippers
| W 127–96
|
|
|
| Los Angeles Memorial Sports Arena
| 9–1
|- align="center" bgcolor="#ccffcc"
| 11
| November 17, 1985
| New Jersey
| W 138–119
|
|
|
| The Forum
| 10–1
|- align="center" bgcolor="#ccffcc"
| 12
| November 20, 1985
| L.A. Clippers
| W 122–107
|
|
|
| The Forum
| 11–1
|- align="center" bgcolor="#ffcccc"
| 13
| November 21, 1985
| @ Denver
| L 120–121
|
|
|
| McNichols Sports Arena
| 11–2
|- align="center" bgcolor="#ccffcc"
| 14
| November 23, 1985
| @ Portland
| W 130–113
|
|
|
| Memorial Coliseum
| 12–2
|- align="center" bgcolor="#ccffcc"
| 15
| November 24, 1985
| San Antonio
| W 118–102
|
|
|
| The Forum
| 13–2
|- align="center" bgcolor="#ccffcc"
| 16
| November 29, 1985
| Seattle
| W 108–107
|
|
|
| The Forum
| 14–2

|- align="center" bgcolor="#ccffcc"
| 17
| December 1, 1985
| Chicago
| W 117–113
|
|
|
| The Forum
| 15–2
|- align="center" bgcolor="#ccffcc"
| 18
| December 4, 1985
| @ Utah
| W 131–127 (OT)
|
|
|
| Salt Palace Acord Arena
| 16–2
|- align="center" bgcolor="#ccffcc"
| 19
| December 6, 1985
| Houston
| W 120–112
|
|
|
| The Forum
| 17–2
|- align="center" bgcolor="#ccffcc"
| 20
| December 8, 1985
| Dallas
| W 125–119
|
|
|
| The Forum
| 18–2
|- align="center" bgcolor="#ccffcc"
| 21
| December 12, 1985
| Phoenix
| W 127–102
|
|
|
| The Forum
| 19–2
|- align="center" bgcolor="#ffcccc"
| 22
| December 13, 1985
| @ Denver
| L 120–124
|
|
|
| McNichols Sports Arena
| 19–3
|- align="center" bgcolor="#ccffcc"
| 23
| December 15, 1985
| Detroit
| W 132–119
|
|
|
| The Forum
| 20–3
|- align="center" bgcolor="#ccffcc"
| 24
| December 17, 1985
| @ New York
| W 105–99
|
|
|
| Madison Square Garden
| 21–3
|- align="center" bgcolor="#ccffcc"
| 25
| December 18, 1985
| @ Milwaukee
| W 107–105
|
|
|
| MECCA Arena
| 22–3
|- align="center" bgcolor="#ccffcc"
| 26
| December 20, 1985
| @ Cleveland
| W 128–116
|
|
|
| Richfield Coliseum
| 23–3
|- align="center" bgcolor="#ccffcc"
| 27
| December 21, 1985
| @ Washington
| W 96–84
|
|
|
| Capital Centre
| 24–3
|- align="center" bgcolor="#ffcccc"
| 28
| December 26, 1985
| @ San Antonio
| L 91–109
|
|
|
| HemisFair Arena
| 24–4
|- align="center" bgcolor="#ccffcc"
| 29
| December 28, 1985
| @ Sacramento
| W 133–111
|
|
|
| ARCO Arena
| 25–4
|- align="center" bgcolor="#ffcccc"
| 30
| December 29, 1985
| Golden State
| L 122–130
|
|
|
| The Forum
| 25–5

|- align="center" bgcolor="#ccffcc"
| 31
| January 3, 1986
| Utah
| W 110–101
|
|
|
| The Forum
| 26–5
|- align="center" bgcolor="#ccffcc"
| 32
| January 5, 1986
| Washington
| W 118–88
|
|
|
| The Forum
| 27–5
|- align="center" bgcolor="#ccffcc"
| 33
| January 8, 1986
| Portland
| W 125–121
|
|
|
| The Forum
| 28–5
|- align="center" bgcolor="#ccffcc"
| 34
| January 10, 1986
| Indiana
| W 124–102
|
|
|
| The Forum
| 29–5
|- align="center" bgcolor="#ffcccc"
| 35
| January 11, 1986
| @ Seattle
| L 99–105
|
|
|
| Seattle Center Coliseum
| 29–6
|- align="center" bgcolor="#ccffcc"
| 36
| January 14, 1986
| Phoenix
| W 143–122
|
|
|
| The Forum
| 30–6
|- align="center" bgcolor="#ccffcc"
| 37
| January 16, 1986
| L.A. Clippers
| W 112–96
|
|
|
| The Forum
| 31–6
|- align="center" bgcolor="#ffcccc"
| 38
| January 19, 1986
| @ Detroit
| L 115–118
|
|
|
| Pontiac Silverdome
| 31–7
|- align="center" bgcolor="#ccffcc"
| 39
| January 20, 1986
| @ Chicago
| W 133–118
|
|
|
| Chicago Stadium
| 32–7
|- align="center" bgcolor="#ffcccc"
| 40
| January 22, 1986
| @ Boston
| L 95–110
|
|
|
| Boston Garden
| 32–8
|- align="center" bgcolor="#ffcccc"
| 41
| January 24, 1986
| @ L.A. Clippers
| L 109–120
|
|
|
| Los Angeles Memorial Sports Arena
| 32–9
|- align="center" bgcolor="#ffcccc"
| 42
| January 25, 1986
| Denver
| L 115–127
|
|
|
| The Forum
| 32–10
|- align="center" bgcolor="#ccffcc"
| 43
| January 28, 1986
| Milwaukee
| W 125–115
|
|
|
| The Forum
| 33–10
|- align="center" bgcolor="#ccffcc"
| 44
| January 30, 1986
| @ Portland
| W 118–94
|
|
|
| Memorial Coliseum
| 34–10
|- align="center" bgcolor="#ccffcc"
| 45
| January 31, 1986
| Philadelphia
| W 134–100
|
|
|
| The Forum
| 35–10

|- align="center" bgcolor="#ffcccc"
| 46
| February 2, 1986
| New York
| L 96–103
|
|
|
| The Forum
| 35–11
|- align="center" bgcolor="#ccffcc"
| 47
| February 4, 1986
| Dallas
| W 110–102
|
|
|
| The Forum
| 36–11
|- align="center" bgcolor="#ccffcc"
| 48
| February 6, 1986
| @ Houston
| W 117–95
|
|
|
| The Summit
| 37–11
|- align="center"
|colspan="9" bgcolor="#bbcaff"|All-Star Break
|- style="background:#cfc;"
|- bgcolor="#bbffbb"
|- align="center" bgcolor="#ffcccc"
| 49
| February 11, 1986
| @ Golden State
| L 113–137
|
|
|
| Oakland-Alameda County Coliseum Arena
| 37–12
|- align="center" bgcolor="#ccffcc"
| 50
| February 12, 1986
| @ Phoenix
| W 126–100
|
|
|
| Arizona Veterans Memorial Coliseum
| 38–12
|- align="center" bgcolor="#ccffcc"
| 51
| February 14, 19867:30p.m. PST
| Atlanta
| W 141–117
| Abdul-Jabbar (25)
| Rambis (12)
| Johnson (16)
| The Forum17,505
| 39–12
|- align="center" bgcolor="#ffcccc"
| 52
| February 16, 1986
| Boston
| L 105–111
|
|
|
| The Forum
| 39–13
|- align="center" bgcolor="#ccffcc"
| 53
| February 19, 1986
| @ Indiana
| W 90–81
|
|
|
| Market Square Arena
| 40–13
|- align="center" bgcolor="#ffcccc"
| 54
| February 21, 1986
| @ New Jersey
| L 106–121
|
|
|
| Brendan Byrne Arena
| 40–14
|- align="center" bgcolor="#ccffcc"
| 55
| February 23, 1986
| @ Philadelphia
| W 125–115
|
|
|
| The Spectrum
| 41–14
|- align="center" bgcolor="#ffcccc"
| 56
| February 24, 19864:30p.m. PST
| @ Atlanta
| L 93–102
| Johnson, Lucas (23)
| Abdul-Jabbar (12)
| Johnson (5)
| The Omni16,522
| 41–15
|- align="center" bgcolor="#ccffcc"
| 57
| February 26, 1986
| @ Dallas
| W 119–116
|
|
|
| Reunion Arena
| 42–15
|- align="center" bgcolor="#ccffcc"
| 58
| February 28, 1986
| Phoenix
| W 115–103
|
|
|
| The Forum
| 43–15

|- align="center" bgcolor="#ffcccc"
| 59
| March 1, 1986
| @ Phoenix
| L 106–123
|
|
|
| Arizona Veterans Memorial Coliseum
| 43–16
|- align="center" bgcolor="#ccffcc"
| 60
| March 3, 1986
| Golden State
| W 127–117
|
|
|
| The Forum
| 44–16
|- align="center" bgcolor="#ccffcc"
| 61
| March 5, 1986
| Utah
| W 130–84
|
|
|
| The Forum
| 45–16
|- align="center" bgcolor="#ccffcc"
| 62
| March 6, 1986
| @ Golden State
| W 112–111
|
|
|
| Oakland-Alameda County Coliseum Arena
| 46–16
|- align="center" bgcolor="#ccffcc"
| 63
| March 8, 1986
| Sacramento
| W 122–121 (2OT)
|
|
|
| The Forum
| 47–16
|- align="center" bgcolor="#ccffcc"
| 64
| March 9, 1986
| @ Seattle
| W 108–106
|
|
|
| Seattle Center Coliseum
| 48–16
|- align="center" bgcolor="#ccffcc"
| 65
| March 11, 1986
| L.A. Clippers
| W 129–108
|
|
|
| The Forum
| 49–16
|- align="center" bgcolor="#ccffcc"
| 66
| March 13, 1986
| Seattle
| W 105–92
|
|
|
| The Forum
| 50–16
|- align="center" bgcolor="#ccffcc"
| 67
| March 16, 1986
| Houston
| W 116–111
|
|
|
| The Forum
| 51–16
|- align="center" bgcolor="#ccffcc"
| 68
| March 18, 1986
| Portland
| W 128–122
|
|
|
| The Forum
| 52–16
|- align="center" bgcolor="#ffcccc"
| 69
| March 19, 1986
| @ L.A. Clippers
| L 114–115
|
|
|
| Los Angeles Memorial Sports Arena
| 52–17
|- align="center" bgcolor="#ccffcc"
| 70
| March 21, 1986
| @ San Antonio
| W 124–102
|
|
|
| HemisFair Arena
| 53–17
|- align="center" bgcolor="#ccffcc"
| 71
| March 22, 1986
| @ Sacramento
| W 115–113
|
|
|
| ARCO Arena
| 54–17
|- align="center" bgcolor="#ccffcc"
| 72
| March 24, 1986
| San Antonio
| W 124–102
|
|
|
| The Forum
| 55–17
|- align="center" bgcolor="#ccffcc"
| 73
| March 25, 1986
| @ Denver
| W 121–115
|
|
|
| McNichols Sports Arena
| 56–17
|- align="center" bgcolor="#ffcccc"
| 74
| March 29, 1986
| @ Seattle
| L 87–88
|
|
|
| Seattle Center Coliseum
| 56–18
|- align="center" bgcolor="#ccffcc"
| 75
| March 30, 1986
| Golden State
| W 124–117
|
|
|
| The Forum
| 56–19

|- align="center" bgcolor="#ccffcc"
| 76
| April 1, 1986
| Seattle
| W 109–104
|
|
|
| The Forum
| 57–19
|- align="center" bgcolor="#ccffcc"
| 77
| April 3, 1986
| Sacramento
| W 135–105
|
|
|
| The Forum
| 58–19
|- align="center" bgcolor="#ffcccc"
| 78
| April 6, 1986
| @ Houston
| L 103–109
|
|
|
| The Summit
| 59–19
|- align="center" bgcolor="#ccffcc"
| 79
| April 8, 1986
| @ Portland
| W 120–114
|
|
|
| Memorial Coliseum
| 60–19
|- align="center" bgcolor="#ccffcc"
| 80
| April 10, 1986
| Houston
| W 117–113
|
|
|
| The Forum
| 61–19
|- align="center" bgcolor="#ccffcc"
| 81
| April 12, 1986
| @ Sacramento
| W 105–92
|
|
|
| ARCO Arena
| 62–19
|- align="center" bgcolor="#ffcccc"
| 82
| April 13, 1986
| Dallas
| L 104–127
|
|
|
| The Forum
| 62–20

Playoffs

|- align="center" bgcolor="#ccffcc"
| 1
| April 17, 1986
| San Antonio
| W 135–88
| Byron Scott (24)
| Kurt Rambis (8)
| Magic Johnson (18)
| The Forum17,505
| 1–0
|- align="center" bgcolor="#ccffcc"
| 2
| April 19, 1986
| San Antonio
| W 122–94
| Magic Johnson (30)
| Abdul-Jabbar, Lucas (10)
| Magic Johnson (13)
| The Forum17,505
| 2–0
|- align="center" bgcolor="#ccffcc"
| 3
| April 23, 1986
| @ San Antonio
| W 114–94
| Kareem Abdul-Jabbar (25)
| Kurt Rambis (14)
| Magic Johnson (17)
| HemisFair Arena7,918
| 3–0
|-

|- align="center" bgcolor="#ccffcc"
| 1
| April 27, 1986
| Dallas
| W 120–116
| Kareem Abdul-Jabbar (28)
| Maurice Lucas (8)
| Magic Johnson (14)
| The Forum17,505
| 1–0
|- align="center" bgcolor="#ccffcc"
| 2
| April 30, 1986
| Dallas
| W 117–113
| Kareem Abdul-Jabbar (26)
| Maurice Lucas (11)
| Magic Johnson (9)
| The Forum17,505
| 2–0
|- align="center" bgcolor="#ffcccc"
| 3
| May 2, 1985
| @ Dallas
| L 108–110
| Kareem Abdul-Jabbar (28)
| Kareem Abdul-Jabbar (12)
| Magic Johnson (14)
| Reunion Arena17,007
| 2–1
|- align="center" bgcolor="#ffcccc"
| 4
| May 4, 1986
| @ Dallas
| L 118–120
| Kareem Abdul-Jabbar (33)
| Magic Johnson (15)
| Magic Johnson (14)
| Reunion Arena17,007
| 2–2
|- align="center" bgcolor="#ccffcc"
| 5
| May 6, 1986
| Dallas
| W 116–113
| Kareem Abdul-Jabbar (34)
| Kurt Rambis (10)
| Magic Johnson (14)
| The Forum17,505
| 3–2
|- align="center" bgcolor="#ccffcc"
| 6
| May 8, 1986
| @ Dallas
| W 120–107
| Kareem Abdul-Jabbar (27)
| Maurice Lucas (8)
| Magic Johnson (17)
| Reunion Arena17,007
| 4–2
|-

|- align="center" bgcolor="#ccffcc"
| 1
| May 10, 1986
| Houston
| W 119–107
| Kareem Abdul-Jabbar (31)
| Johnson, Lucas (7)
| Magic Johnson (18)
| The Forum17,505
| 1–0
|- align="center" bgcolor="#ffcccc"
| 2
| May 13, 1986
| Houston
| L 102–112
| Magic Johnson (24)
| Kurt Rambis (9)
| Magic Johnson (19)
| The Forum17,505
| 1–1
|- align="center" bgcolor="#ffcccc"
| 3
| May 16, 1986
| @ Houston
| L 109–117
| Kareem Abdul-Jabbar (33)
| Johnson, Lucas (8)
| Magic Johnson (20)
| The Summit16,016
| 1–2
|- align="center" bgcolor="#ffcccc"
| 4
| May 18, 1986
| @ Houston
| L 95–105
| James Worthy (26)
| Magic Johnson (12)
| Magic Johnson (11)
| The Summit16,016
| 1–3
|- align="center" bgcolor="#ffcccc"
| 5
| May 21, 1986
| Houston
| L 112–114
| Kareem Abdul-Jabbar (26)
| Kareem Abdul-Jabbar (13)
| Magic Johnson (13)
| The Forum17,505
| 1–4
|-

Player statistics
Note: GP= Games played; MPG= Minutes per Game; REB = Rebounds; AST = Assists; STL = Steals; BLK = Blocks; PTS = Points; PPG = Points per Game

Season

Playoffs

Award winners
 Michael Cooper, J. Walter Kennedy Citizenship Award
 Magic Johnson, All-NBA First Team
 Kareem Abdul-Jabbar, All-NBA First Team
 Michael Cooper, NBA All-Defensive Second Team

Transactions

References

 Lakers on Database Basketball
 Lakers on Basketball Reference

Los Angeles Lakers seasons
Los
Los Angle
Los Angle